Quartet Skaz is a concert quartet employing Russian folk instruments: the prima domra, prima balalaika, alto domra, and bass balalaika.

History 
Founded in 1973, Quartet Skaz pioneered instrumental chamber performance on Russian folk instruments in the USSR.  Since then, the Quartet has actively promoted both Russian folk and classical music.
Quartet Skaz’s recordings include several LP’s and three CD’s, as well as many recordings for radio and television. In 1989, the Quartet recorded Balastroika, the first CD in Soviet music, produced by PAN Records. In 1994, Quartet Skaz participated in the recording of the soundtrack of the film Catherine the Great (USA), with a symphony orchestra with musicians from Germany, Hungary and the US.  Later in 1995, Skaz performed for the soundtrack of the film The Adventures of Young Indiana Jones: Travels with Father (USA). In 2000, Quartet Skaz recorded 14 pieces for an international folk dance project.  Russian Disk produced the Quartet’s next CD, Skaz, Russian Folk Quartet, in 2009. In 2016, Skaz recorded music for the soundtrack of the film Vermelho Russo (Brazil). And in a first for Russian folk instruments, the quartet recorded a CD of Iranian folk melodies, Tea from a Samovar, produced in the US in 2017.

In the words of Irina Arkhipova, “through its creative and social efforts, the Quartet [Skaz] has achieved great recognition and popularity among a wide audience of music lovers."
For Joseph Kobzon, Quartet Skaz is characterized by “a unique sound, impeccable taste, and extraordinary breadth and diversity of performance.”

Awards 
Quartet Skaz received the Lenin Komsomol Prize in 1985 "for great mastery in performance and promotion of folk-music creativity among the youth", and is a laureate of the First Moscow Competition for Performing Artists. A recipient of the Adam Mickiewicz and Alexander Pushkin Medal in Poland, the Quartet has been awarded honorary diplomas at home form the Russian military and Federal Guard Service of the Russian Federation, and aboard in Armenia, Mongolia, Nepal, Tajikistan, Uzbekistan, Venezuela, and the United States.

Discography

Compact discs 
 Quartet Skaz, "Balastroika", 1989, PAN Records, The Netherlands, PAN-139-CD.
 Quartet Skaz, "Skaz, Russian Folk Quartet", 2009, Russian Disc, Moscow, RD-CD-00858.
 Quartet Skaz, "Tea from a Samovar", 2017, Masherbrum Art, Addison, MA-54.

Other albums and recordings 
 "The Losers’ Ensemble", Musical Film, 1976. Featured in the film are Alla Pugacheva, G. Leybel and V. Nikolsky, and Quartet Skaz.
 Quartet Skaz, "Oh, you night!" (Ах, Ты Вечер), LP, 1976, Melodiya, Moscow, C22-07257-58.
 "Snow House" (Снежный дом), dramatization of fairytale by A. N. Tolstoy, LP, 1977, Melodiya, Moscow.
 Quartet Skaz, "Russian Lubok" (Русский Лубок), LP, 1977, Melodiya, Moscow, C20-08997-8.
 Quartet Skaz, "Skaz: Quartet of Russian Folk Instruments" (Квартет русских народных инструментов "Сказ"), LP, 1979, Melodiya, Moscow, C20-11839/08998.
 Quartet Skaz, "Kalinushka" (Калинушка), LP, 1980, Melodiya, Moscow, C20—14835-36.
 "The Magic Apple" (Волшебное яблочко), dramatization of a story written and directed by O. Anofriev, with L. Larina and Quartet Skaz, LP, 1980, Melodiya, Moscow.
 Quartet Skaz, "Around the World" (Вокруг Света), LP, 1983, Melodiya, Moscow, C20-19457-003.
 Quartet Skaz, The Best of Quartet Skaz" (Лучшее Из Репертуара Квартета "Сказ"), LP, 1990, Melodiya, Moscow, C20 29229 001.

References

Further reading 
 Alexandre Marchakovsky, “The Legendary Quartet: All About Skaz", 2012, Part 1 and Part 2 
 Anatoly Zhurin, "Quartet Skaz, and what the King of Football Himself Told Them", on the occasions of the 35th anniversary of the founding of Quartet Skaz, Evening Moscow (Вечерняя Москва), Moscow, 2010 
 Yelizaveta Uvarova, "The Stage in Russia: 20th-Century Creators," Moscow, 2004.
 A. I. Peresada, "International Encyclopedia of Ensembles and Orchestras of Russian Folk Instruments," All-Russia Musical Society, Krasnodar, 2004.
 Musica na Mochila, Quartet Skaz on TV Brazil.
 B. Selmengin, "Skaz with an Iranian Accent", The Literary Journal (Литературная газета), 10, Moscow, 2018

External links 
 Quartet Skaz’s official website (in Russian and English)

Russian folk music groups
Musical quartets
1973 establishments in Russia
Musical groups established in 1973